Thomas O. Bales Jr. is an American Entrepreneur and Inventor and is the co-founder of Symbiosis Corp.,Syntheon LLC, both medical device companies and EAC an aerospace company.

Early life and education
Tom Bales was born in Honolulu, Hawaii and spent his childhood in Pensacola, Florida He is the son of Lieutenant Colonel Thomas O. Bales Sr. a Marine Corp. fighter pilot. and Julia (née Fulghum). He is a graduate of Massachusetts Institute of Technology with a major in Mechanical Engineering.

Career
Tom Bales began his engineering career with medical device Company Cordis Corporation (Later acquired by Johnson and Johnson) He left Cordis to help form Cordis Spinoff Theratek International. In 1988 Tom Left Theratek to branch out on his own and start Symbiosis Corp. with Kevin Smith. After selling Symbiosis to American Home Products Corp. (Now Wyeth Division of Pfizer) for $175,000,000 he remained on staff for 4 years as Chief Technology Officer before leaving to start Environmental Aeroscience Corp (EAC) and Syntheon LLC.

Tom holds 205 US Patents in the fields of Medical Devices, Material Science, Electronics and Propulsion.

Tom is the Chief Scientist for the Energetic Ray Global Observatory (ERGO)Project,

Tom is the President of the Symbiosis Foundation

Personal life
Tom Bales is married to Constance Ryan. They have 3 Sons - William Bales, Maxwell Bales and Gregory Bales

References

1948 births
Living people
Businesspeople from Miami